D55 motorway, formerly R55 expressway is a highway in the Czech Republic. When completed, it will connect all main cities along the river Morava.

Only two small segments are completed, others are planned.

Under construction

Images

References

External links 
Info on ceskedalnice.cz 
Info on dalnice-silnice.cz 

R55
Proposed roads in the Czech Republic